James Robertson Brown (19 July 1925 – 7 November 2008) was a Scottish football goalkeeper, who played for Heart of Midlothian, Kilmarnock, St Mirren, Stranraer and Falkirk in the Scottish Football League. He was also temporarily loaned to Southend and East Fife.

Brown played for Scotland in every match of a tour of North America in 1949. The last match of the tour was against the United States, but the Scottish Football Association does not consider this match to be a full international.

References

External links

1925 births
2008 deaths
People from Buckhaven
Association football goalkeepers
Scottish footballers
Heart of Midlothian F.C. players
Kilmarnock F.C. players
St Mirren F.C. players
Stranraer F.C. players
Falkirk F.C. players
Scottish Football League players
Scottish expatriate footballers
Expatriate soccer players in Canada
Southend United F.C. players
East Fife F.C. players
Footballers from Fife